Edward Wilkes Dunn (born June 19, 1980) is an American lawyer and former actor known for his portrayal of Duncan Kane in the Rob Thomas television series Veronica Mars.

Early life and education
Dunn grew up in Durham, North Carolina. He attended Phillips Academy, a preparatory high school in Andover, Massachusetts, and graduated in 1999. At Phillips Academy, Dunn became involved in theatre, playing the role of Jerry in Edward Albee's The Zoo Story and the lead character of Alceste in Molière's The Misanthrope, directed by Kevin Heelan. Dunn attended Northwestern University, where he studied theatre and political science. He earned a Juris Doctor from the Boston College Law School in 2013.

Career

Acting 
Dunn was cast as a series regular for the first season of Veronica Mars as Duncan Kane, but left halfway through season 2 in the episode "Donut Run." He came back for a cameo in the season finale of season 2, "Not Pictured," but did not reprise his role in the third season. He also appeared in the 2004 remake of The Manchurian Candidate. The same year, he had a guest appearance on Gilmore Girls. He also had a guest appearance on Grey's Anatomy in 2006. He appeared in the 2008 film Jumper as Mark Kobold.

Law 
Dunn practiced law with Walden Macht & Haran LLP, a law firm in New York City from 2018 to 2020. Prior to that he was a law clerk to federal district judge William J. Martini of New Jersey, a litigation associate at Dechert LLP, and a legal intern for the International Criminal Tribunal for the former Yugoslavia and the office of the attorney general of Massachusetts.

As of 2020, he is an assistant United States attorney at the District of Columbia United States Attorney's Office.

Personal life
He married Kendall Morrison on June 24, 2017. They have a son, born in 2019.

Filmography

References

External links 
 

American male film actors
American male television actors
21st-century American lawyers
21st-century American actors
Living people
Phillips Academy alumni
Northwestern University School of Communication alumni
Boston College Law School alumni
1980 births